Dame Alison Marie Rose-Slade  ( Rose; born November 1969) is a British banker, and chief executive (CEO) of NatWest Group since November 2019. She became the first woman to lead a major UK lender after leading government investigations into the poor representation of women in business. She became a Dame Commander of the Order of the British Empire in 2023.

Early life
Rose was born in 1969. She grew up overseas in a military family. She graduated with a bachelor's degree in History from Durham University in 1991.

Career
Rose started her career as a graduate trainee with National Westminster Bank in 1992.

She was appointed a member of RBS's executive committee on 27 February 2014. In October 2014, as head of commercial and private banking at RBS, she announced a new plan for the bank to bring more women in decision-level and board-level positions. In August 2015, she encouraged her managers to reconnect with the SMBs part of their clientele.

In September 2018, she was nominated to lead the Treasury's review focusing on barriers for women in business. The Rose Review found that just one in three UK entrepreneurs is female and only one per cent of venture funding goes to all-female teams. In November 2018, she became deputy chief executive of NatWest Holdings.

In March 2019, the UK Government published a policy paper, the Alison Rose Review of Female Entrepreneurship. In April 2019, Rose was "widely-tipped" to succeed Ross McEwan as CEO.

Rose was the chief executive of commercial and private banking at Royal Bank of Scotland Group and deputy chief executive of NatWest Holdings. In September 2019, it was announced that she would succeed Ross McEwan as CEO of RBS Group on 1 November 2019, making her the "first woman to lead major UK lender". RBS Group was re-named NatWest Group in 2020.

Rose was appointed Dame Commander of the Order of the British Empire (DBE) in the 2023 New Year Honours for services to the financial sector and later that month she was given an honorary degree by the new Chancellor of York University Dr Heather Melville.

External appointments

She is non-executive Director of Great Portland Estates plc, Chair of the McLaren/Deloitte Advisory Council and sits on the board of Coutts Charitable Foundation.

Personal life
Rose is married, with two children, a daughter and a son. She and her family live in Highgate, London.

References

External links 
 Official biography

1969 births
Living people
British bankers
Alumni of St Aidan's College, Durham
British women chief executives
NatWest Group people
Dames Commander of the Order of the British Empire